Hauya is a genus of plants of the family Onagraceae native to montane Central America. They are related to a lineage that gave rise to Fuchsia and Circaea.

Species

References

 
Onagraceae genera
Taxa named by Alphonse Pyramus de Candolle
Taxa named by Martín Sessé y Lacasta
Taxa named by José Mariano Mociño